In computer science multi-agent planning involves coordinating the resources and activities of multiple agents.

NASA says, "multiagent planning is concerned with planning by (and for) multiple agents. It can involve agents planning for a common goal, an agent coordinating the plans (plan merging) or planning of others, or agents refining their own plans while negotiating over tasks or resources. The topic also involves how agents can do this in real time while executing plans (distributed continual planning). Multiagent scheduling differs from multiagent planning the same way planning and scheduling differ: in scheduling often the tasks that need to be performed are already decided, and in practice, scheduling tends to focus on algorithms for specific problem domains".

See also
Automated planning and scheduling
Distributed artificial intelligence
Cooperative distributed problem solving and Coordination
Multi-agent systems and Software agent and Self-organization
Multi-agent reinforcement learning
 Task Analysis, Environment Modeling, and Simulation (TAEMS or TÆMS)

References

Further reading
 Durfee's (1999) chapter on Distributed Problem Solving and Planning 
 desJardins et al. (1999). A Survey of Research in Distributed, Continual Planning. 
 .
  See Chapter 2; downloadable free online.

External links
 A tutorial on planning in multiagent systems

Multi-agent systems
Automated planning and scheduling